Roberto Derlin (17 July 1942 – 4 June 2021) was an Italian professional football player and manager.

Career
Born in La Spezia, Derlin played for clubs including Spezia and Genoa.

References

1942 births
2021 deaths
Italian footballers
Spezia Calcio players
Genoa C.F.C. players
Italian football managers
People from La Spezia
Association footballers not categorized by position
Sportspeople from the Province of La Spezia